Renee Chenault-Fattah (born October 12, 1957) is an American journalist and former co-anchor of the WCAU NBC 10 News at 4 and 6 p.m. on weeknights in Philadelphia. She is married to former U.S. Congressman Chaka Fattah of the 2nd Congressional District of Pennsylvania.

Biography

Early life and education
 
Chenault-Fattah majored in political science at Johns Hopkins University, and went on to earn her J.D. at the University of Pennsylvania Law School. She worked at Hughes Hubbard & Reed, a law firm in New York, and then clerked for Judge Damon Keith of the Sixth Circuit Court of Appeals.  She then began her media career, earning a master's degree in journalism at the University of Missouri in Columbia, Missouri.

Career
She joined WCAU, then the Philadelphia CBS TV affiliate, in September 1991, and served as an anchor and a reporter. After a few years anchoring the noon broadcast with Tim Lake, Chenault-Fattah was promoted to the 6 p.m. and 11 p.m. news in March 1995. By then, WCAU had become the NBC affiliate in Philadelphia. In 2003, Lake joined Chenault as co-anchor at 4 p.m., 6 p.m., and 11 p.m., after she had spent 8 years co-anchoring newscasts at 6 and 11, first with Ken Matz and then with Larry Mendte.

The criminal case involving her husband, Chaka Fattah, made it increasingly difficult for Chenault-Fattah to continue as an anchor, and she went on leave for seven months following his indictment. Ultimately, she left the station on February 24, 2016. Although she was mentioned in a business dealing of her husband's, Chenault-Fattah was never charged with anything in connection with the activities that ultimately led to his conviction.

Chenault-Fattah serves on the board of trustees of Johns Hopkins University.

Chenault-Fattah serves on the board of directors of Philadelphia Lawyers for Social Equity, a non-profit dedicated to assisting low-income Philadelphians in overcoming hurdles caused by past criminal records.

Honors and awards
Chenault-Fattah was named to the PoliticsPA list of "Sy Snyder's Power 50" list of influential individuals in Pennsylvania politics in 2002. She was also named to the PoliticsPA list of "Pennsylvania's Most Politically Powerful Women"

The Broadcast Pioneers of Philadelphia inducted Chenault-Fattah into their Hall of Fame in 2009.

Personal life
Chenault-Fattah is the third wife of Pennsylvania politician Chaka Fattah, and they have a daughter together named Chandler Fattah. Two and a half years prior to marrying Fattah, Chenault-Fattah had a daughter named Cameron Chenault through artificial insemination. She is stepmother to Frances ("Fran") Fattah, and Chaka Fattah Jr., known as "Chip" (31 years old in March 2015).

References 

1957 births
Living people
Television anchors from Philadelphia
Philadelphia television reporters
American television journalists
American women television journalists
African-American television personalities
Spouses of Pennsylvania politicians
University of Pennsylvania Law School alumni
University of Missouri alumni
21st-century African-American people
21st-century African-American women
20th-century African-American people
20th-century African-American women